Psilocybe brunneocystidiata is a species of psilocybin mushroom in the family Hymenogastraceae. Found in Papua New Guinea, it was described as new to science in 1978 by mycologists Gastón Guzmán and Egon Horak.

See also
List of Psilocybe species
List of psilocybin mushrooms

References

External links

Entheogens
Psychoactive fungi
brunneocystidiata
Psychedelic tryptamine carriers
Fungi described in 1978
Fungi of New Guinea
Taxa named by Gastón Guzmán